Abdullah Al-Yousef (born 29 October 1997) is a Saudi Arabian footballer who plays as a left-back for Saudi Pro League side Al-Batin on loan from Al-Fateh.

Career
On 8 January 2023, Al-Yousef joined Al-Batin on a six-month loan.

Career statistics

Club

References

External links
 

1997 births
Living people
Saudi Arabian footballers
Association football defenders
Association football fullbacks
Saudi Professional League players
Al-Fateh SC players
Al Batin FC players
Saudi Arabia youth international footballers
Asian Games competitors for Saudi Arabia
Saudi Arabian Shia Muslims
People from Al-Hasa